The Pitt shag (Phalacrocorax featherstoni), also known as the Pitt Island shag or Featherstone's shag is a species of bird in the family Phalacrocoracidae.  It is endemic to Pitt Island.  Its natural habitats are open seas and rocky shores.  It is threatened by habitat loss.

This representative of the shags in the Chatham Group was discovered by H.H. Travers in 1871. Buller dedicated the species to Dr Featherston, superintendent of the Province of Wellington at that time.

Apparently never a common species, it was reported as nearly extinct in 1905. The Department of Conservation does have a recovery plan for this bird.

Members of the shag family belong to three groups, based on the colour of their feet: black, yellow or pink. Outside New Zealand, the black-footed shags are better known as cormorants. The Pitt shag belongs to the yellow footed group.

References

External links
Holotype and specimens of Phalacrocorax featherstoni Buller, 1873 in the collection of the Museum of New Zealand Te Papa Tongarewa
BirdLife Species Factsheet.

Birds of the Chatham Islands
Phalacrocorax
Birds described in 1873
Taxa named by Walter Buller
Taxonomy articles created by Polbot
Endemic birds of New Zealand